Martin Mayhew (born October 8, 1965) is an American football executive who is the general manager of the Washington Commanders of the National Football League (NFL). A former cornerback, Mayhew played college football at Florida State prior to being drafted by the Buffalo Bills in the tenth round of the 1988 NFL Draft. He sat out his rookie season due to a wrist injury and joined the Washington Redskins a year later, with whom he won Super Bowl XXVI with, and later played for the Tampa Bay Buccaneers before retiring following the 1996 season.

Following his playing career, he graduated from the Georgetown University Law Center with a Juris Doctor degree in 2000. He then worked as an administrator for the XFL before joining the Detroit Lions in 2001, where he worked as an assistant executive prior to being promoted to general manager in 2008. He remained in that role until 2015 and later had executive stints with the New York Giants and San Francisco 49ers in the late 2010s before joining Washington as their general manager in 2021.

Early life and college
Mayhew was born on October 8, 1965 in Daytona Beach, Florida. He attended Florida High School prior to enrolling a year early at Florida State University in 1983, where he played 33 career games at cornerback for the Florida State Seminoles football team opposite future Pro Football Hall of Famer Deion Sanders. He was also a member of their track and field team. He was named an Academic All-America in 1985 and was also included on the All-South Independent second-team. He graduated with a Bachelor of Science degree in business management in 1987.

Professional career

Player

Mayhew was drafted by the Buffalo Bills in the tenth round (262nd overall) of the 1988 NFL Draft. He suffered a wrist injury during his rookie year and was placed on injured reserve before he could make any game appearances with them. He left in free agency the following year and signed with the Washington Redskins, where he started for them over the next four seasons including in their Super Bowl XXVI win at the end of the 1991 season.

In 1993, he signed a four-year $5.5 million contract with the Tampa Bay Buccaneers. He was offered a new contract by them during the 1997 offseason but declined it and subsequently retired, citing the lack of competitive compensation, the recent birth of his child, and his desire to finish his law degree that he started while living in Washington. He finished his career playing in 118 games with 473 tackles, 21 interceptions, 4 forced fumbles, and a sack.

Executive
Mayhew interned for nine months within the Redskins' personnel department in 1999, where he assisted in scouting players for the team leading up to the 2000 NFL Draft. The following year, he worked as a labor operations and legal intern for the NFL league office, and was also the director of football administration for the XFL until it folded after its lone season in 2001. That same year, Mayhew was hired by the Detroit Lions as their senior director of football administration by Matt Millen before being promoted to assistant general manager in October 2004. He became the team's general manager upon the firing of Millen in September 2008 and retained that role for eight seasons until being fired following a 1–7 start to the 2015 season.

Mayhew spent the 2016 season with the New York Giants as their director of football operations before joining the San Francisco 49ers as a senior personnel executive the following year. He was promoted to their vice president of player personnel in 2019. In January 2021, Mayhew was hired as the general manager of the Washington Commanders.

Personal life
Following his time at Florida State, Mayhew briefly worked at a First Union bank in Charlotte. He attended night classes at Georgetown University Law Center during his time with the Redskins in the early 1990s but had to drop out when he left for the Buccaneers in 1993. He re-enrolled there following his retirement as a player in 1997 and graduated with a Juris Doctor degree in 2000. Mayhew is a member of The Florida Bar and has also served as a board member of the Henry Ford Museum and Detroit Police Athletic League (PAL).

References

External links
 
 Washington Commanders bio
 

1965 births
20th-century African-American sportspeople
21st-century African-American sportspeople
African-American players of American football
African-American sports executives and administrators
American football cornerbacks
Detroit Lions executives
Florida State Seminoles football players
Georgetown University Law Center alumni
Living people
National Football League general managers
New York Giants executives
Players of American football from Tallahassee, Florida
San Francisco 49ers executives
Sportspeople from Daytona Beach, Florida
Tampa Bay Buccaneers players
Washington Commanders executives
Washington Football Team executives
Washington Redskins players